Chima Daniel "Danny" Uchechi  (born 14 September 1989) is a Nigerian football forward for East Grinstead Town.

Career
Uchechi was born in Abia State and moved to England in 2002.
Uchechi scored 13 goals with the Charlton Athletic under-18 team, then added five goals in reserve squad matches in 2008–09 season. Uchechi signed for West Ham United in spring 2009. After being released by West Ham, Uchechi returned in summer 2010 to Nigeria National League side FC Dender.

Loan to Leicester City
Uchechi was loaned in January 2011 to Leicester City. He was not given a squad number for the 2010–11 season for Leicester City and did not feature for the first team. In a reserve game for Leicester City, against San Jose Earthquakes in a behind-closed-doors friendly at Belvoir Drive, he scored a penalty after Miguel Vítor had been fouled in the penalty area.

Trials with UK clubs
Uchechi was to start the 2011/2012 pre-season training with Scottish Premier League side Aberdeen, on 20 July 2011, however, Uchechi played the second half of a pre-season friendly for English side Peterborough United F.C. on trial.

Loan to Sheffield Wednesday
Following a successful short trial at Sheffield Wednesday, Megson was impressed with his good feet, good pace and ability to get a goal and offered him a loan move until January 2012. Uchechi became Gary Megson's seventh summer recruit and was given the number 27. He made his Owls debut in the League Cup win against Blackpool on 11 August 2011 just hours after he put pen to paper. On 24 November 2011 it was confirmed that his loan spell with the club had been cut short.

Aberdeen
Aberdeen FC's Craig Brown signed Uchechi on a six-month deal, with the possibility of a two-year extension, on 31 January 2012 after a week-long trial.

Sweden
On 26 November 2012 it was announced that Swedish club AFC United had signed Uchechi on a two-year deal.

He signed with Dalkurd, another Swedish club in April 2014.

Return to England
Following a spell with BSV Hürtürkel in the German fifth tier, Uchechi joined Boreham Wood for the 2016-17 season. Uchechi joined Hendon for the 2017-18 season. After manager Gary McCann joined Hampton & Richmond Borough for the 2018-19 season, Uchechi followed him shortly afterwards. In December 2018 he joined Cray Wanderers, and then South Park in March 2019. Uchechi scored on his debut for Hornchurch on 10 August 2019. He briefly joined Burgess Hill Town in March 2020, before joining East Grinstead Town at the start of the 2020-21 season. He re-joined Burgess Hill in August 2021, before re-joining Cray two months later. In February 2022 he re-joined East Grinstead.

International career
Uchechi received his first international callup in the 2008 Intercontinental Cup in Malaysia. He was called up for an African Youth Championship qualifier in Senegal, and for both legs against Sudan, but had to pull out with injury. He played three games by the 2009 FIFA U-20 World Cup for the Nigeria national under-20 football team.

References

1989 births
Living people
Association football forwards
Igbo sportspeople
Nigerian footballers
Nigeria under-20 international footballers
Charlton Athletic F.C. players
West Ham United F.C. players
Remo Stars F.C. players
Leicester City F.C. players
Sheffield Wednesday F.C. players
Aberdeen F.C. players
AFC Eskilstuna players
Dalkurd FF players
Boreham Wood F.C. players
Hendon F.C. players
Hampton & Richmond Borough F.C. players
Cray Wanderers F.C. players
South Park F.C. players
Hornchurch F.C. players
Burgess Hill Town F.C. players
East Grinstead Town F.C. players
Nigerian people of Togolese descent
2011 CAF U-23 Championship players
English Football League players
Scottish Premier League players
National League (English football) players
Isthmian League players
Sportspeople from Abia State
Nigerian emigrants to the United Kingdom
Expatriate footballers in England
Expatriate footballers in Scotland
Expatriate footballers in Sweden
Expatriate footballers in Germany
Nigerian expatriate sportspeople in Sweden